Tomahawk is a free, open-source cross-platform music player for Windows, macOS and Linux. An Android beta client version was launch in June 2016. It focuses on the conglomeration of the user's music library across local and network collections as well as streaming services. The project was marked as abandoned by their authors on May 10, 2017.

About
Tomahawk has a familiar iTunes-like interface. The left column offers access to playlists, search history, favorite tracks, charts, and other categories.

Features
Tomahawk allows to install plug-ins for several different music services. These include:

 Spotify
 YouTube
 Jamendo
 Grooveshark
 Last.fm
 SoundCloud
 ownCloud
 4shared
 Dilandau
 Official.fm
 Ampache
 Subsonic
 Google Play Music
 Beats Music
 Beets
 Rdio (currently Android only)
 Deezer (currently Android only)

Toma.hk and Hatchet
In 2013, Tomahawk launched Toma.hk, a website that generates embeddable HTML code for songs and artists, allowing direct links to playable tracks online.

In March 2014, Tomahawk launched its cross-platform sync and social platform called "Hatchet" in beta. It provides users the ability to sync playlists and "loved" tracks across multiple devices. The service was planned to allow users to see what other users are listening to and share playlists through the Tomahawk application.

The last build was released in April 2015, after which progress stalled. In May 2017, developer Anton Romanov confirmed that the project is abandoned.

See also
 List of Linux audio software

References

External links
 

Free audio software
Audio software
Linux media players
MacOS media players
Windows media players
Online music database clients
Audio player software that uses Qt